Sargis II Jaqeli (1271 – 1334) was a Georgian prince (mtavari) and ruler of Principality of Samtskhe from 1306 to 1334. He was a son of Prince Beka I Jaqeli. During his father's reign Sargis participated in many campaigns. In 1290s Azat Mousa, leader of the Anatolian Turkoman tribes, attacked Samtskhe. Beka Jaqeli appointed Sargis as a commander of army and ordered him to stop Turks near village Vashlovani. Around 1303, Sargis defeated Turkoman tribes and expelled them from Meskhetian lands. In 1306, after his father's death, Sargis ascended the Atabeg's throne. He was made Amirspasalar by his nephew, King George V "the Brilliant". After Sargis II's death, his son Qvarqvare became a new Prince of Meskheti, also the vassal of Georgian kingdom.

References

House of Jaqeli
Atabegs of Samtskhe
Nobility of Georgia (country)
Military personnel from Georgia (country)
13th-century people from Georgia (country)
14th-century people from Georgia (country)
1334 deaths
1271 births
Year of birth unknown